This is a survey of the postage stamps and postal history of Eswatini, formerly Swaziland.

The first stamps of Swaziland were overprinted stamps of South African Republic (Transvaal) issued 18 October 1889. Swaziland became a protectorate of the South African Republic in 1894 and the stamps of the South African Republic were used.

In 1902, Swaziland became a British protectorate following the Second Boer War and the stamps of the Transvaal Colony were used. From 1910, the stamps of the Union of South Africa were used. Stamps were issued for Swaziland again in 1933.

In 1967, Swaziland issued stamps as a self-governing protected state. The kingdom gained independence in 1968. Since 2018, stamps are inscribed "Eswatini".

Further reading 
 Higson, Andrew. The Stamps of Swaziland 1889-1894. Loughborough: Transvaal Study Circle, 2004, 12p.
 Pirie, J.H. Harvey. Stamps and Postal History of Swaziland and of the New Republic. Johannesburg: The Philatelic Federation of South Africa, 1956, 68p.
Proud, Ted. The Postal History of Swaziland & Zululand. Heathfield, Sussex: Postal History Publications, 1996 , 182p.
 van der Molen, Peter. Swaziland Philately to 1968: A handbook detailing the postage stamps and their forgeries, the postmarks, the postal stationery, the postal history and the revenues of Swaziland to independence in 1968. London: The Royal Philatelic Society, 2013 , 532p.

See also
 List of people on stamps of Swaziland
 Postage stamps and postal history of Transvaal

References 

Eswatini
Communications in Eswatini